Bella Donna is a 1909 British romance novel by the British writer Robert Hichens.

Summary
A flighty young Englishwoman marries an Egyptologist. Once on the archaeological site she falls for a suave Egyptian, and plots to do away with her husband.

Reception
It was listed among the top six bestselling books in the United States in the December 1909 (ranked sixth) and January 1910 (ranked second) issues of The Bookman.Best Selling Books, The Bookman, December 1909, p. 434Best Selling Books, The Bookman, January 1910, p. 546

Adaptations
It has been made into films on four occasions:
 Bella Donna (1915 film), an American silent film starring Pauline Frederick
 Bella Donna (1923 film), an American silent film starring Pola Negri
 Bella Donna (1934 film), a British film starring Conrad Veidt
 Temptation (1946 film), an American film starring Merle Oberon

References

Bibliography
 Goble, Alan. The Complete Index to Literary Sources in Film. Walter de Gruyter, 1999.
 Kotowski, Mariusz. Pola Negri: Hollywood's First Femme Fatale. University Press of Kentucky, 2014.

1909 British novels
Novels by Robert Hichens 
British romance novels
British novels adapted into films
Novels set in Egypt